United States passports are passports issued to citizens and nationals of the United States of America. They are issued exclusively by the U.S. Department of State. Besides passports (in booklet form), limited-use passport cards are issued by the same government agency subject to the same requirements. It is unlawful for U.S. citizens and nationals to enter or exit the country without a valid U.S. passport or passport-replacement document compliant with the Western Hemisphere Travel Initiative, though there are many exceptions; waivers are generally granted for U.S. citizens returning without a passport, and the exit requirement is not enforced.  As of 2022, United States passport allows visa-free travel to 186 countries and territories, ranking as the 7th most powerful in the world in terms of travel freedom.

U.S. passport booklets conform with recommended standards (i.e., size, composition, layout, technology) of the International Civil Aviation Organization (ICAO). There are five types of passport booklets; the State Department has issued only biometric passports as standard since August 2007. U.S. passports are federal property and must be returned to the government upon demand.

By law, a valid unexpired U.S. passport (or passport card) is conclusive (and not just prima facie) proof of U.S. citizenship, with the same force and effect as proof as certificates of naturalization or citizenship if issued to a U.S. citizen for the full period allowed by law. U.S. law does not prohibit its citizens from holding passports of other countries.

History

American consular officials issued passports to some citizens of some of the thirteen states during the American Revolutionary War (1775–1783). Passports were sheets of paper printed on one side, included a description of the bearer, and were valid for three to six months. The minister to France, Benjamin Franklin, based the design of passports issued by his mission on that of the French passport.

From 1776 to 1783, no state government had a passport requirement. The Articles of Confederation government (1783–1789) did not have a passport requirement.

The Department of Foreign Affairs of the war period also issued passports, and the department, carried over by the Articles of Confederation government (1783–1789), continued to issue passports. In July 1789, the Department of Foreign Affairs was carried over by the government established under the Constitution. In September of that year, the name of the department was changed to Department of State. The department handled foreign relations and issued passports, and until the mid-19th century had various domestic duties.

For decades thereafter, passports were issued not only by the Department of State but also by states and cities, and by notaries public. For example, an internal passport dated 1815 was presented to Massachusetts citizen George Barker to allow him to travel as a free black man to visit relatives in Southern slave states. Passports issued by American authorities other than the Department of State breached propriety and caused confusion abroad. Some European countries refused to recognize passports not issued by the Department of State, unless United States consular officials endorsed them. The problems led the Congress in 1856 to give the Department of State the sole authority to issue passports.

From 1789 through late 1941, the constitutionally established government required passports of citizens only during two periods: during the American Civil War (1861–1865), as well as during and shortly after World War I (1914–1918). The passport requirement of the Civil War era lacked statutory authority. During World War I (1914–1918), European countries instituted passport requirements. The Travel Control Act of May 22, 1918, permitted the president, when the United States was at war, to proclaim a passport requirement, and President Wilson issued such a proclamation on August 18, 1918. World War I ended on November 11, 1918, but the passport requirement lingered until March 3, 1921, the last day of the Wilson administration.

In Europe, general peace between the end of the Napoleonic Wars (1815) and the beginning of World War I (1914), and the development of railroads, gave rise to international travel by large numbers of people. Countries such as Czarist Russia and the Ottoman Empire maintained passport requirements. After World War I, many European countries retained their passport requirements. Foreign passport requirements undercut the absence of a passport requirement for Americans exiting the country, under United States law, between 1921 and 1941.

The contemporary period of required passports for Americans under United States law began on November 29, 1941. A 1978 amendment to the Immigration and Nationality Act of 1952 made it unlawful to enter or depart the United States without an issued passport even in peacetime.

Even when passports were not usually required, Americans requested U.S. passports. Records of the Department of State show that 130,360 passports were issued between 1810 and 1873 and that 369,844 passports were issued between 1877 and 1909. Some of those passports were family passports or group passports. A passport application could cover, variously, a wife, a child, or children, one or more servants, or a woman traveling under the protection of a man. The passport would be issued to the man. Similarly, a passport application could cover a child traveling with their mother. The passport would be issued to the mother. The number of Americans who traveled without passports is unknown.

The League of Nations held a conference in 1920 concerning passports and through-train travel, and conferences in 1926 and 1927 concerning passports. The 1920 conference put forward guidelines on the layout and features of passports, which the 1926 and 1927 conferences followed up. Those guidelines were steps in the shaping of contemporary passports. One of the guidelines was about 32-page passport booklets, such as the U.S. type III mentioned in this section, below. Another guideline was about languages in passports. A conference on travel and tourism held by the United Nations in 1963 did not result in standardized passports. Passport standardization was accomplished in 1980 under the auspices of the International Civil Aviation Organization.

The design and contents of U.S. passports changed over the years. Prior to World War I the passport was typically a large diploma, with a large engraved seal of the Department of State at the top, repeated in red wax at the bottom, the bearer's description and signature on the left, and his name on the right above space for data such as "accompanied by his wife," all in ornate script. In 1926, the Department of State introduced the type III passport. This had a stiff red cover, with a window cut-out through which the passport number was visible. That style of passport contained 32 pages. American passports had green covers from 1941 until 1976, when the cover was changed to blue, as part of the U.S. bicentennial celebration of 1975–1977, and remained blue afterwards until 1993. Green covers were again issued from April 1993 until March 1994, and included a special tribute to Benjamin Franklin in commemoration of the 200th anniversary of the United States Consular Service. After March 1994, blue passports, with pages showing U.S. state seals, were reissued. In 2007, images showcasing landscapes of the United States as well as places and objects of significance to U.S. history were introduced.

Initially, a U.S. passport was issued for two years, although by the 1950s on application by the holder a passport could be stamped so that this time was extended without reissue. Stamping for a further extension is not permitted at present. In the succeeding decades the periods of validity for adult applicants were gradually extended to three, five, and eventually ten years, the current standard.

In 1981, the United States became the first country to introduce machine-readable passports. In 2000, the Department of State started to issue passports with digital photos, and as of 2010, all previous series have expired. In 2006, the Department of State began to issue biometric passports to diplomats and other officials.
Later in 2006, biometric passports were issued to the public. Since August 2007, the department has issued only biometric passports, which include RFID chips.

The United States participates in the Five Nations Passport Group, an international forum for cooperation between the passport issuing authorities in the United Kingdom, Canada, New Zealand, and Australia to "share best practices and discuss innovations related to the development of passport policies, products and practices".

The United States Department of State has announced, and, in March 2021, started to issue, the next generation passport. The passport will have an embedded data chip on the information page protected by a polycarbonate coating; this will help prevent the book from getting wet and bending, and—should a passport be stolen—the chip will keep thieves from stealing personal information and falsifying an identity. The passport number will also be laser cut as perforated holes that get progressively smaller through pages—just one of several components of the "Next Generation" passport, including artwork upgrade, new security features such as a watermark, "tactile features," and more "optically variable" inks. Some designs on pages will be raised, and ink—depending on the viewing angle—will appear to be different colors. On November 18th, 2022, the Department of State announced that they are now issuing all passport books as Next Generation Passports.

In June 2021, Secretary of State Antony Blinken announced that an option for American passport holders to select a third gender category on their passports was planned but would take time to implement. Additionally, applicants changing their gender would no longer be required to provide external documentation like a court order or medical certification. From April 11, 2022, the options listed on valid US Passport holders for sex/gender markers will be M, F and X—as announced formally by the Biden Administration within the State Department.

In September 2022, the State Department  created a Pilot Program to allow a limited amount of applicants renew their passports online. Applicants who wish to participate in this program will no longer need to mail their supporting documents to the processing centers. Instead, they will be asked to enter their information online and upload a digital passport photo. However, the processing times to renew online remain the same as to renew by mail. As of October 26, 2022, the program has been temporarily closed.

Administration
Authority for issuing passports is conferred on the Secretary of State by the Passport Act of 1926, subject to such rules as the President of the United States may prescribe. The Department of State has issued regulations governing such passports, and its internal policy concerning issuance of passports, passport waivers, and travel letters is contained in the Foreign Affairs Manual.

Passport Services, a unit of the Bureau of Consular Affairs within the Department of State, is responsible for passport issuance. It operates 26 regional passport agencies that are open to the general public. They are located in Arkansas; Atlanta; Boston; Buffalo; Chicago; Colorado; Connecticut; Dallas; Detroit; El Paso; Honolulu; Houston; Los Angeles; Miami; Minneapolis; New Hampshire; New Orleans; New York City; Philadelphia; San Diego; San Francisco; San Juan; Seattle; Tucson; Vermont; and Washington, D.C. Two additional passport agencies are not open to the general public: one in Charleston, and the Special Issuance Agency in Washington, D.C., which issues official, diplomatic, and no-fee U.S. Passports for U.S. government employees, high-ranking officials, and Peace Corps volunteers.

There are about 9,000 passport acceptance facilities in the United States, designated by Passport Services, at which routine passport applications may be filed. These facilities include United States courts, state courts, post offices, public libraries, county offices, and city offices. In fiscal year 2020, the Department of State issued 11,711,945 passports (including 1,741,527 passport cards) and there were 143,116,633 valid U.S. passports in circulation. The passport possession rate of the U.S. was approximately 43% of the population.

Restrictions
It is unlawful to enter or exit the U.S. without a valid passport or passport-replacement document compliant with the Western Hemisphere Travel Initiative (WHTI), or without an exception or waiver.

The use of passports may be restricted for foreign policy reasons. In September 1939, in order to preserve the United States' neutrality in relation to the breakout of World War II, then Secretary of State Cordell Hull issued regulations declaring that outstanding passports, together with passports issued thereafter, could not be used for travel to Europe without specific validation by the Department of State, and such validation could not last more than six months. Similar restrictions can still be invoked upon notice given in the Federal Register, and such notice was issued in 2017, so that passports were "declared invalid for travel to, in, or through the DPRK unless specially validated for such travel."

As confirmed in Haig v. Agee (1981), the administration may deny or revoke passports for foreign policy or national security reasons at any time, and for other reasons as prescribed by regulations. A notable example of enforcement of this was the 1948 denial of a passport to U.S. Representative Leo Isacson, who sought to go to Paris to attend a conference as an observer for the American Council for a Democratic Greece, a Communist front organization, because of the group's role in opposing the Greek government in the Greek Civil War. Denial or revocation of a passport does not prevent the use of outstanding valid passports. The physical revocation of a passport is often difficult, and an apparently valid passport can be used for travel until officially taken by an arresting officer or by a court.

The lack of a valid passport (for whatever reason, including revocation) does not render the U.S. citizen either unable to leave the United States, or inadmissible into the United States. The United States is a signatory of the International Covenant on Civil and Political Rights, which guarantees residents of its signatories wide-ranging rights to enter or depart their own countries. In Nguyen v. INS, the Supreme Court stated that U.S. citizens are entitled "...to the absolute right to enter its borders." Lower federal courts went as far as to declare that "...the Government cannot say to its citizen, standing beyond its border, that his reentry into the land of his allegiance is a criminal offense; and this we conclude is a sound principle whether or not the citizen has a passport, and however wrongful may have been his conduct in effecting his departure." Therefore, even in the absence of a valid passport, U.S. citizens are not denied entry into the United States, though these travelers may be delayed while the CBP attempts to verify their identity and citizenship status. The U.S. does not exercise passport control on exit from the country, so the individual attempting to depart from the U.S. only needs to have valid documents granting the right to entry into the country of destination.

Travel of U.S. citizens and nationals around the United States and across its international borders is generally controlled by means other than passports, such as the No Fly List.

Requirements

Citizens
United States passports are issuable only to persons who owe permanent allegiance to the United States – i.e., citizens and non-citizen nationals of the United States.

Under the 14th amendment to the US Constitution, "All persons born or naturalized in the United States, and subject to the jurisdiction thereof, are citizens of the United States ..." Under this provision, "United States" means the 50 states and the District of Columbia only, but also technically includes the uninhabited Palmyra Atoll, an incorporated territory due to the Insular Cases.

By acts of Congress, every person born in Puerto Rico, the U.S. Virgin Islands, Guam, and the Northern Mariana Islands is a United States citizen by birth. Also, every person born in the former Panama Canal Zone whose father or mother (or both) was a citizen is a United States citizen by birth. Other acts of Congress provide for acquisition of citizenship by persons born abroad.

Non-citizen nationals

Every citizen is a national of the United States, but not every national is a citizen. The only current example of non-citizen US nationals are those born in American Samoa (including Swains Island). Unlike the other current US territories, people born in American Samoa are not automatically granted US citizenship by birth as the territory is not incorporated and an act of Congress granting it, similar to other US territories, has not yet been passed for American Samoa. The other historical groups of non-citizen US nationals include those of former US territories and during periods of time before the acts of Congress granting citizenship to those born in current territories.

Passport in lieu of certificate of non-citizenship nationality
Few requests for certificates of non-citizenship nationality are made to the Department of State, which are issuable by the department. Production of a limited number of certificates would be costly, which if produced would have to meet stringent security standards. Due to this, the Department of State chooses not to issue such certificates; instead, passports are issued to non-citizen nationals. The issued passport certifies the status of a non-citizen national. The certification is in the form of "U.S. National" instead of "USA" on the front of the passport card, or an endorsement in the passport book: "The bearer is a United States national and not a United States citizen."

Dual citizenship
United States law permits dual nationality. Consequently, it is permissible to have and use a foreign passport. However, U.S. citizens are required to use a U.S. passport when leaving or entering the United States. This requirement extends to a U.S. citizen who is a dual national.

Application
An application is required for the issuance of a passport. If a fugitive being extradited to the United States refuses to sign a passport application, the consular officer can sign it "without recourse."

An application for a United States passport made abroad is forwarded by a U.S. embassy or consulate to Passport Services for processing in the United States. The resulting passport is sent to the embassy or consulate for issuance to the applicant. An emergency passport is issuable by the embassy or consulate. Regular issuance takes approximately 6 to 8 weeks. As per Haig v. Agee, the Presidential administration may deny or revoke passports for foreign policy or national security reasons at any time.

Places where a U.S. passport may be applied for include post offices and libraries.

Forms
DS11 Standard

 The applicant has never been issued a U.S. passport
 The applicant is over age 16
 The applicant was under age 16 when upon the issuance of the applicant's previous passport
 The applicant's recent U.S. passport was issued more than 15 years ago
 The applicant's most recent U.S. passport was lost or stolen
 The applicant's name has changed since the applicant's U.S. passport was issued and the applicant is unable to legally document the change of name

All applicants using a form DS-11 must appear in person, and pay an additional $35 execution fee, in addition to the cost of their passport book and/or card. In addition, the first time an applicant applies for a passport following or during gender reassignment must also use a Form DS-11.

DS82 Renewal

The applicant's most recent U.S. passport:

Is undamaged and can be submitted with the application
Was issued when the applicant was age 16 or older
Was issued within the last 15 years
Was issued in the applicant's current name or the applicant can legally document a change of name

The advantage of the DS-82 passport renewal form is a traveller can mail in the form on their own, and they also do not have to pay the $35 processing fee associated with a DS-11 passport application.

DS64 Lost

Lost or stolen passport requires DS64 in addition to DS11 only if the lost passport is valid due to the second passport rule:

Second passport
More than one valid United States passport of the same type may not be held, except if authorized by the Department of State.

It is routine for the Department of State to authorize a holder of a regular passport to hold, in addition, a diplomatic passport or an official passport or a no-fee passport.

One circumstance which may call for issuance of a second passport of a particular type is a prolonged visa-processing delay. Another is safety or security, such as travel between Israel and a country which refuses to grant entry to a person with a passport which indicates travel to Israel. The period of validity of a second passport issued under either circumstance is generally four years from the date of issue.

Document requirements
 valid state photo ID
 birth certificate or naturalization certificate
 2x2 photo

Passport photograph
Passport photo requirements are very specific. Official State Department photographic guidelines are available online.

 
 The height of the head (top of hair to bottom of chin) should measure 
 Front view, full face, open eyes, closed mouth, and neutral expression
 Full head from the top of the hair to the shoulders
 Plain white or off-white background
 No shadows on the face or in the background
 No sunglasses (unless medically necessary). As of November 1, 2016, the wearing of eyeglasses in U.S. passport photos is not allowed.
 No hat or head covering (unless for religious purposes; religious head covering must not obscure hairline)
 Normal contrast and lighting

Fees
Fees for applying vary based on whether or not an applicant is applying for a new passport or they are renewing an expiring passport. Fees also vary depending on whether an applicant is under the age of 16.

Price history
In 1983, the State Department declared that the existing passport fee of $10 was insufficient to cover costs, so the fee was raised from $10 to $35, and new passports were changed to be valid for a decade instead of for five years. The fee for individuals under 18 years of age was also raised from $10 to $20 for a five-year passport. Until that year, passport fees had only been raised by one dollar since 1932.  In a 2004 USPS Passport Services publication, "Fees total $85 for adults (16 years and older), with separate payments of $30 to the U.S. Postal Service® for its processing fee and $55 to the Department of State for its passport application fee. For those under 16, the total cost is $70, with separate payments of $30 to the U.S. Postal Service for its processing fee and $40 to the Department of State for its passport application fee."

Prices were again increased in 2010. Fees for a brand-new passport went from $100 to $135 (from $85 to $105 for those under 16), and renewal fees climbed from $75 to $110. Passport cards also saw new and increased fees: $55 for adults and $40 for children. The State Department raised these and other fees after conducting "an exhaustive study of the true cost of providing consular services."  In 2018, first-time adult applicants were charged $110 per passport book and $30 per passport card. Additionally, a $35 execution fee was also charged for every first time applications.

First-time applications
On December 27, 2021, effectively 2022, first-time adult applicants are charged $130 per passport book and $30 per passport card. Additionally, a $35 execution fee is charged per transaction, but only for first applications and not for renewals. This means people applying for the passport book and card simultaneously on the same application pay only one execution fee.

All minor applicants are considered first-time applicants until they reach age 16. Minor applicants pay a $100 application fee for the passport book and a $15 application fee for the passport card. The same $35 execution fee is charged per application.

Renewal applications
Adults wishing to renew their passports may do so up to five years after expiration at a cost of $130 for the passport book and $30 for the passport card. Passports for minors under age 16 cannot be renewed.

Special renewal rules
If a person is already in possession of a passport book and would like a passport card additionally (or vice versa), they may submit their currently valid passport book or card as evidence of citizenship and apply for a renewal to avoid paying a $35 execution fee. However, if the passport book or card holder is unable or unwilling to relinquish their currently valid passport for the duration of the processing, they may submit other primary evidence of citizenship, such as a U.S. birth certificate or naturalization certificate, and apply as a first time applicant, paying the execution fee and submitting a written explanation as to why they are applying in this manner.

Additional fees

An expedite fee of $60 is charged when applicants request faster processing, regardless of age. This processing is currently 2–3 weeks when applying at an acceptance facility. The same fee is charged for expedited service when applying at a Passport Agency within 14 days of travel.
In addition to the expedite fee, applicants may pay an additional $17.56 to receive overnight mail return when their application has finished processing. This can be paid in combination with the application fee when applying, or added later by calling the National Passport Information Center. However, overnight mail return is only available for the U.S. Passport Book. Passport cards may not be overnight mailed.
As of January 1, 2016, passports may no longer have pages added to them. When applying for a new passport, applicants may apply for a 28-page or 52-page passport, with no additional cost for obtaining the 52-page passport.

Types 

Regular Passport (dark blue cover)Issuable to all citizens and non-citizen nationals. Periods of validity: for those age 16 or over, generally ten years from the date of issue; for those 15 and younger, generally five years from the date of issue. A sub-type of regular passports is no-fee passports, issuable to citizens in specified categories for specified purposes, such as an American sailor for travel connected with his duties aboard a U.S.-flag vessel. Period of validity: generally 5 years from the date of issue. A no-fee passport has an endorsement which prohibits its use for a purpose other than a specified purpose.
Service (gray cover) Issuable to "certain non-personal services contractors who travel abroad in support of and pursuant to a contract with the U.S. government", to demonstrate the passport holder is travelling "to conduct work in support of the U.S. government while simultaneously indicating that the traveler has a more attenuated relationship with the U.S. government that does not justify a diplomatic or official passport." Period of validity: generally five years from the date of issue.

Official (maroon cover) Issuable to citizen-employees of the United States assigned overseas, either permanently or temporarily, and their eligible dependents, and to some members of Congress who travel abroad on official business. Also issued to U.S. military personnel when deployed overseas. Period of validity: generally five years from the date of issue.

Diplomatic (black cover) Issuable to American diplomats accredited overseas and their eligible dependents, to citizens who reside in the United States and travel abroad for diplomatic work, to the President of the United States, the President-elect, the Vice President, and Vice President-elect, as well as former presidents and vice presidents. The Chief Justice, Supreme Court Justices, current cabinet members, former secretaries and deputy secretaries of state, the Attorney General and Deputy Attorney General, some members of Congress, and retired career ambassadors are also eligible for a diplomatic passport. Period of validity: generally five years from the date of issue.

Refugee Travel Document (also known as "Refugee Passport") (blue-green cover) Not a full passport, but issued to aliens who have been classified as refugees or asylees.
Re-entry Permit (blue-green cover), cover titled "Travel Document" Not a full passport, but issued to a permanent resident alien in lieu of a passport. The re-entry permit guarantees them permission to re-enter the U.S. and is usually valid for a period of two years. A re-entry permit can also be used by permanent residents who are stateless or cannot get a passport for international travel, or who wish to visit a country they cannot on their passport.
Emergency (violet cover)Issuable to citizens overseas, in urgent circumstances, e.g. imminent death and funeral of a family member, lost or stolen passport while abroad, or similar situation. Period of validity: generally one year from the date of issue. An emergency passport may be exchanged for a full-term passport.
U.S. passport cardNot a full passport, but a small ID card issued by the U.S. government for crossing land and sea borders with Canada, Mexico, the Caribbean, and Bermuda. All persons eligible for a regular passport book are eligible for a passport card. The card does not denote the bearer's official or diplomatic status, if any. The ID card is valid for 10 years for people 16 or older and 5 years for minors under 16. The passport card is not valid for international air travel. It is possible to hold the U.S. passport card in addition to a regular passport. These ID cards are WHTI and Real ID compliant, making them valid for domestic air travel, and have digitally-signed biometrics within an internal RFID chip, readable at a land or sea port of entry into or out of the United States.

Layout

Format

On the front cover, a representation of the Great Seal of the United States is at the center. "PASSPORT" (in all capital letters) appears above the representation of the Great Seal, and "United States of America" appears below (in Garamond italic on non-biometric passports, and Minion italic on post-biometric passports).

An official passport has "OFFICIAL" (in all capital letters) above "PASSPORT". The capital letters of "OFFICIAL" are somewhat smaller than the capital letters of "PASSPORT".

A diplomatic passport has "DIPLOMATIC" (in all capital letters) above "PASSPORT". The capital letters of "DIPLOMATIC" are somewhat smaller than the capital letters of "PASSPORT".

A Travel Document, in both forms (Refugee Travel Document and Permit to Re-Enter), features the seal of the Department of Homeland Security instead of the Great Seal of the United States. Above the seal the words "TRAVEL DOCUMENT" appears in all capital letters. Below the seal is the legend "Issued by U.S. Citizenship and Immigration Services" in upper and lower case.

In 2007, the passport was redesigned after a previous redesign in 1993. There are 13 quotes in the 28-page version of the passport and patriotic-themed images on the background of the pages.

A biometric passport has the e-passport symbol at the bottom. There are 32 pages in a biometric passport. Frequent travelers may request 52-page passports for no additional cost. Extra visa pages could previously be added to a passport, but, as of January 1, 2016, the service was discontinued entirely for security reasons.

Data page and signature page

Each passport has a data page and a signature page.

A data page is a page containing information about the passport holder. It is the only page in a U.S. passport laminated in plastic to prevent tampering. A data page has a visual zone and a machine-readable zone. The visual zone has a digitized photograph of the passport holder, data about the passport, and data about the passport holder:

 Photograph
 Type [of document, which is "P" for "passport"]
 Code [of the issuing country, which is "USA" for "United States of America"]
 Passport Number
 Surname
 Given Name
 Nationality (United States of America)
 Date of Birth
 Place of Birth (see below)
 Sex (M, F or X)
 Date of Issue
 Date of Expiration
 Authority (United States Department of State)
 Endorsements

The machine-readable zone is present at the bottom of the page.

A signature page has a line for the signature of a passport holder. A passport is not valid until it is signed by the passport holder in black or blue ink. If a holder is unable to sign his passport, it is to be signed by a person who has legal authority to sign on the holder's behalf.

In June 2021, the Department of State announced that it would be starting a process to allow for a third gender on passports, as well as allowing applicants to self-select male or female on their passport applications instead of submitting medical certificates for a change of gender.

Place of birth
Place of birth was first added to U.S. passports in 1917. The standards for the names of places of birth that appear in passports are listed in volume 8 of the Foreign Affairs Manual, published by the Department of State. A request to list no place of birth in a passport is never accepted.

U.S. birthplaces
For birthplaces within the United States and its territories, it contains the name of the state or territory followed by "U.S.A." (e.g. Wisconsin, U.S.A), except for the U.S. Virgin Islands and American Samoa which are listed alone. For persons born in Washington State or the District of Columbia, passports indicate "Washington, U.S.A." or "Washington, D.C., U.S.A.", respectively, as the place of birth.

Foreign birthplaces
For Americans whose place of birth is located outside the United States, only the country or dependent territory is mentioned. The name of the country is the current name of the country that is presently in control of the territory of the place of birth and thus changes upon a change of a country name. For example, Americans born before 1991 in the former Soviet Union (including the Baltic states, whose annexation by the Soviet Union was never recognized by the U.S.) would have the post-Soviet country name listed as the place of birth, e.g. Armenia instead of the Armenian Soviet Socialist Republic, Soviet Union. Another example is that for Americans born in the former Panama Canal Zone, "Panama" is listed as the place of birth for people born on or after October 1, 1979; people born prior to October 1 can opt to designate the city of place of birth. A citizen born outside the United States, who objects to the standard country name, may be able to have his city or town of birth entered on the passport. However, if a foreign country denies a visa or entry due to the place-of-birth designation, the Department of State will issue a replacement passport at normal fees, and will not facilitate entry into the foreign country.

China, Taiwan, Hong Kong/Macau SARs
Special provisions exist to deal with the complexities of American passport holders born in the Greater China Region. Per the One-China policy, the United States recognizes the People's Republic of China as the sole legal government of China, and acknowledges the Chinese position that Taiwan is a part of China, while considering the status of Taiwan to be undetermined. However, Americans born in Taiwan can choose to have either "Taiwan", "China", or their city of birth listed as place of birth. Americans born in Hong Kong or Macau would have their place of birth as "Hong Kong SAR" or "Macau SAR," but the option of listing the city of birth only (e.g. "Hong Kong" or "Macau" without "SAR") is not available. As Tibet is recognized as part of China, the place of birth for Americans born in Tibet is written as "China", with the option of listing only the city of birth.

Israel and the Palestinian territories
Special provisions are in place for Americans born in Israel and the Palestinian territories.

For births in places other than Jerusalem and the Golan Heights, "Israel", "West Bank", or "Gaza Strip" is used. If born before 1948 or in other cases, "Palestine" may be used.

For births in the Golan Heights, "Israel" has been used since March 2019 when the US recognized the Golan Heights as part of Israel; previously "Syria" was used regardless of date of birth.

Prior to October 2020, due to the legal uncertainty of the status of Jerusalem, "Jerusalem" was used for births in Jerusalem within its 1948 municipal borders regardless of date of birth. In 2002, Congress passed legislation that said that American citizens born in Jerusalem may list "Israel" as their country of birth, although Presidents George W. Bush and Barack Obama did not allow it. A federal appeals court declared the 2002 law invalid on July 23, 2013, and the Supreme Court upheld that decision on June 8, 2015. In October 2020, the Department of State announced that it had changed its policy and stated that Americans born in Jerusalem would be permitted to have either "Jerusalem" or "Israel" designated as their place of birth. However, for those who were born before 1948 in areas outside of Jerusalem's 1948 municipal limits but now are included within Jerusalem, their place of birth is listed as "Palestine" or the area's name as known before the expansion of Jerusalem. Those born after 1948 in these areas may choose to have the area's name listed as their place of birth, but not as "Jordan" or "West Bank".

In all cases, the city or town of birth may be used in place of the standard designations.

Born in the air or at sea
For an American born aboard an aircraft or ship, if the birth occurs in an area where no country has sovereignty (i.e. in or over international waters), the place of birth is listed as "in the air" or "at sea" where appropriate.

Passport message
Passports of many countries contain a message, nominally from the official who is in charge of passport issuance (e.g., secretary of state, minister of foreign affairs), addressed to authorities of other countries. The message identifies the bearer as a citizen of the issuing country, requests permission for the bearer to enter and pass through the other country, and requests further that, when necessary, given help consistent with international norms. In American passports, the message is in English, French, and Spanish. The message reads:

In English:
The Secretary of State of the United States of America hereby requests all whom it may concern to permit the citizen/national of the United States named herein to pass without delay or hindrance and in case of need to give all lawful aid and protection.

in French:
Le Secrétaire d'État des États-Unis d'Amérique prie par les présentes toutes autorités compétentes de laisser passer le citoyen ou ressortissant des États-Unis titulaire du présent passeport, sans délai ni difficulté et, en cas de besoin, de lui accorder toute aide et protection légitimes.

and in Spanish:
El Secretario de Estado de los Estados Unidos de América por el presente solicita a las autoridades competentes permitir el paso del ciudadano o nacional de los Estados Unidos aquí nombrado, sin demora ni dificultades, y en caso de necesidad, prestarle toda la ayuda y protección lícitas.

The term "citizen/national" and its equivalent terms ("citoyen ou ressortissant"; "ciudadano o nacional") are used in the message as some people born in American Samoa, including Swains Island, are nationals but not citizens of the United States.

The masculine inflections of "Le Secrétaire d'État" and "El Secretario de Estado" are used in all passports, regardless of the sex of the Secretary of State at the time of issue.

Sex offenders 
In November 2017, pursuant to the International Megan's Law, the Department of State announced that passports of US citizens previously convicted of sex crimes against minors would be endorsed with the message, "The bearer was convicted of a sex offense against a minor, and is a covered sex offender pursuant to [U.S. law]."

Languages
At a League of Nations conference in 1920 about passports and through-train travel, a recommendation was that passports be written in French (historically, the language of diplomacy) and one other language.

English, the de facto national language of the United States, has always been used in U.S. passports. At some point after 1920, English and French were used in passports. Spanish was added during the second term of the Clinton administration.

The field names on the data page, the passport message, the warning on the second page that the bearer is responsible for obtaining visas, and the designations of the amendments-and-endorsements pages, are printed in English, French, and Spanish.

Biometric versions
The legal driving force behind biometric passports is the Enhanced Border Security and Visa Entry Reform Act of 2002, which states that smart-card identity cards may be used in lieu of visas. That law also provides that foreigners who travel to the U.S., and want to enter the U.S. visa-free under the Visa Waiver Program, must bear machine-readable passports that comply with international standards. If a foreign passport was issued on or after October 26, 2006, that passport must be a biometric passport.

The electronic chip in the back cover of a U.S. passport stores an image of the photograph of the passport holder, passport data, and personal data of the passport holder; and has capacity to store additional data. The capacity of the radio-frequency identification (RFID) chip is 64 kilobytes, which is large enough to store additional biometric identifiers in the future, such as fingerprints and iris scans. Data within the chip is signed with an RSA-2048 certificate issued to the U.S. Department of State by the ICAO Public Key Directory. Any and all data must be authentic and untampered, or else the signature will be invalidated.

Data in a passport chip is scannable by electronic readers, a capability which is intended to speed up immigration processing. This data, along with the signature, is verified to either be valid or invalid. Like toll-road chips, data in passport chips can be read when passport chips are adjacent to readers. The passport cover contains a radio-frequency shield in the form of a wire mesh within the cover, so the cover must be opened for the data to be read. This cover acts as a Faraday cage.

According to the Department of State, the Basic Access Control (BAC) security protocol prevents access to that data unless the printed information within the passport is also known or can be guessed.

According to privacy advocates, the BAC and the shielded cover are ineffective when a passport is open, and a passport may have to be opened for inspection in a public place such as a hotel, a bank, or an Internet cafe. An open passport is subject to unwelcome reading of chip data, such as by a government agent who is tracking a passport holder's movements or by a criminal who is intending identity theft.

Visa requirements

Visa requirements for United States citizens are administrative entry restrictions by the authorities of other states placed on citizens of the United States. As of January 11, 2022, holders of a United States passport can visit 186 countries and territories without a visa or with a visa on arrival, ranking it sixth in terms of travel freedom (tied with Belgium, New Zealand, Norway, Switzerland and the United Kingdom) according to the Henley Passport Index. Additionally, Arton Capital's Passport Index ranked the United States passport fourth in the world in terms of travel freedom, with a visa-free score of 160 (tied with Belgium, New Zealand, Poland, Portugal, Spain and Switzerland), as of January 2022. 
United States Passport is ranked 3rd by the Global Passport Power Rank. 
The United States Government has prohibited all U.S. nationals from traveling to North Korea without special permission, making all United States passports invalid for travel to, in, or through the country.

Foreign travel statistics

These are the numbers of visits by U.S. nationals to various countries in 2015 (unless otherwise noted):

Gallery of historic images

See also

 Five Nations Passport Group
 Iroquois passport
 Real ID Act
 Ruth Shipley, head of the Passport Division, 1928 to 1955
 Visa policy of the United States
 Visa requirements for United States citizens

Notes

References

Bibliography
 International Civil Aviation Organization, Machine Readable Travel Documents, https://web.archive.org/web/20070126030848/http://mrtd.icao.int/.

 
 
 
 
United States Department of State, Bureau of Consular Affairs, Photographer's Guide. (archive)
United States Department of State, Foreign Affairs Manual, "8 FAM FAM Passports and Consular Reports of Birth Abroad"
United States Department of State, Passport Office, The United States Passport: Past, Present, Future (Washington, D.C.: United States Department of State, Passport Office, 1976).
United States Department of State, Passports, Passport Home.
22 C.F.R. Part 51.
8 U.S.C. secs. 1185, 1504.
18 U.S.C. secs. 1541–1547.
22 U.S.C. secs. 211a–218, 2705, 2721.
U.S. Sentencing Guidelines secs. 2L2.1, 2L2.2.

United States
Passport
Passport
Passport